The Floating Island is a 1673 satirical novel by Richard Head, though he published it under the name of Frank Careless. It is a parody of stories of adventure, describing the travels of captain Robert Owe-much through distant lands, which reference various neighbourhoods of London.

References

1670s novels
1673 books
English adventure novels
17th-century Irish novels